Newtownards Airport  is a local airfield in Newtownards, County Down, Northern Ireland. This airport offers not only light aircraft flights but also helicopter flights which are operated by HeliPower, Microlight flights operated by NI Microlights and flight simulator training by AlphaTech. The airport also has an onsite restaurant called Cloud Nine.

Newtownards Aerodrome has a CAA Ordinary Licence (number P659) that allows flights for the public transport of passengers or for flying instruction as authorised by the licensee (Ulster Flying Club (1961) Limited).

Airfield history and operations
Newtownards Airport opened in August 1934 and until the construction of Sydenham airport (Belfast Harbour) in March 1938 was served by UK scheduled internal passenger and mail flights.

The following Royal Air Force units were here at some point under RAF Newtownards:
 'S' Flight of No. 1 Anti-Aircraft Co-operation Unit RAF (January – November 1942) became No. 1617 (Anti-Aircraft Co-operation) Flight RAF
 Detachment of No. 6 Anti-Aircraft Co-operation Unit RAF (May 1942 – May 1943 & May – August 1943)
 Detachment of No. 7 Anti-Aircraft Co-operation Unit RAF (April – May 1941)
 No. 13 Squadron RAF
 Relief Landing Ground for No. 24 Elementary Flying Training School RAF (November 1939 – July 1940)
 No. 79 (Signals) Wing Calibration Flight RAF
 No. 82 Group Communication Flight RAF (January 1942 – June 1943)
 No. 96 (Wireless) Wing RAF (? – May 1944)
 No. 201 Gliding School RAF (April 1944 – May 1946)
 No. 203 Gliding School RAF (May 1945 – July 1947)
 No. 416 (Army Co-operation) Flight RAF (June – July 1940) became No. 231 Squadron RAF
 No. 664 Volunteer Gliding School RAF (November 1995 – )
 No. 1480 (Anti-Aircraft Co-operation) Flight RAF (December 1941 – December 1943) became No. 290 Squadron RAF
 No. 1493 (Fighter) Gunnery Flight RAF (January – May 1942) became No. 1493 (Target Towing) Flight RAF (May – January 1943)
 No. 2775 Squadron RAF Regiment
 RAF Northern Ireland Communication Flight RAF (May 1944 – 1945)

Ulster Flying Club

It is the home airfield of the Ulster Flying Club. The Ulster Flying Club (UFC) was founded in 1961 and over the subsequent years has grown to become Northern Ireland's largest flying school and one of the largest, non commercial training, flying organizations in Northern Ireland. The club manages the airfield's facilities. The clubhouse is currently open to the public for snacks and for viewing activities at the airfield, as a new clubhouse was opened in 2005 after the destruction of the last clubhouse by a fire in 2004. Many private pilot owners and self-build constructors base their aircraft in the several hangars on the airfield.

The Ulster Flying Club has continued to develop as a centre for private flying and so the ends of existing runways were re-surfaced and the grass strip tarmacked. The Ulster Flying Club has allowed the airfield to be used for various events including air display days and motorsport events.

The Ulster Flying Club provides both leisure flights and flight training for those who wish to pursue a pilot's licence. The club operates a fleet of five fixed wing aircraft. It consists of three C-172 SPs and two C152s.

The UFC operates the G-UFC tail registration with the following:
G-UFCE, G-UFCG, G-UFCI (G1000 glass cockpit)- Cessna 172s.
G-UFCN, G-UFCP – Cessna 152s.

G-UFCO was involved in a fatal crash in April 2018.

Recently added new PAPIs on 21/03 and lights on 15/33 have allowed the airfield and UFC to safely carry out night flying and flying in bad visibility.

Radio frequencies 
The airfield operates an A/G service and until 25 October 2018 the frequency was 128.300mhz; it has since moved to an 8.33 channel and is now 128.305

Fixed Base Operators

Ards Model Flying Club

Formed in 2019, the Ards Model Flying Club operates from premises at the Western side of the Airfield. The club is open to all disciplines of remote controlled aircraft flying and is affiliated to the British Model Flying Association.

HeliPower

HeliPower operates leisure and charter flights as well as helicopter fight training for the PPL (H) pilot licence. They operate several rotary aircraft including Robinson R22, R44 and Bell Jet Ranger

NI Microlights

NI Microlights is an independent flight school operating from the airfield. They offer a range of Microlight services including NPPL tuition and trial flights, flight tests, aircraft sales, servicing, permits and repairs. Training is carried out on the Thuster Microlight aircraft (fixed wing), and the P&M GT450 (flexwing)

AlphaTech flight simulator training

AlphaTech carry out flight simulator training for the Airbus A320 series of aircraft. They operate a fixed base simulator training device, which is used for professional pilot flight training, SimPilot training and flight experiences.

O'Neill aircraft maintenance

Aircraft maintenance for permit and vintage aircraft is carried out by a small group of aircraft engineers based in the O'Neill hangar. Annual permit inspections, kit build projects, routine maintenance, engine and airframe repairs are carried out by inspectors approved by the Light Aircraft Association (LAA) and the British Microlight Aircraft Association (BMAA).

See also

 List of former Royal Air Force stations

References

Citations

Bibliography

External links
Ulster Flying Club
Ards Model Flying Club
HeliPower
NI Microlights
AlphaTech
CAA AIP Charts

1934 establishments in Northern Ireland
Airports in Northern Ireland
County Down
Newtownards